Acala is the municipal seat of Acala Municipality, in Chiapas, southern Mexico.

As of 2010, the city of Acala had a population of 13,889, up from 12,686 as of 2005.

References

Populated places in Chiapas